Heritage Round was a round of matches in the Australian Football League in which all the teams wore throwback guernseys from their past. The first Heritage Round was in 2003 and had been continuing every year until 2008.

Origin 
The concept of the Heritage Round originated from the Centenary Celebration Round, which took place in 1996, the centenary year of the VFL/AFL.

1996 VFL/AFL Centenary 
The remaining eight clubs played in their normal jumpers, as they came into the VFL/AFL at different times, from 1908 to 1995.

Matches - Round 7
 May 8th - Essendon Bombers vs Geelong Cats - M.C.G.
 May 10th - Collingwood Magpies vs St Kilda Saints - M.C.G.
 May 11th - Carlton Blues vs Fitzroy Lions - Princes Park.
 May 11th - Melbourne Demons vs South Melbourne/Sydney Swans - M.C.G.

Team names in bold indicate the winning team of each match.

Heritage guernseys used in 1996:
 Carlton Blues — 1897 to 1913 guernsey (Round 7).
 Collingwood Magpies — 1897 to 1907 guernsey (Round 7).
 Essendon Bombers — 1900 to 1921 Essendon Town/Essendon A guernsey (Round 7).
 Fitzroy Lions — 1883 to 1907 guernsey (Round 7).
 Geelong Cats — 1981 to 1907 guernsey (Round 7).
 Melbourne Demons — 1877 to 1915 guernsey (Round 7).
 St Kilda Saints — 1883 to 1911 guernsey (Round 7).
 South Melbourne/Sydney Swans — 1905 to 1906 guernsey (Round 7).

Heritage Round Over The Years

2003 Heritage Round

The first Heritage Round in 2003 saw heritage guernseys worn by all teams except two. It was seen in a very positive and nostalgic light, especially as Brisbane wore the 1968 to 1973 Fitzroy guernsey which was Maroon and Navy Blue and worn during the days of Black and White TV. Sydney wore their 1933 to 1986 South Melbourne/Sydney Swans guernsey. St. Kilda's guernsey got such a positive reaction that it became their Clash Guernsey from 2004 until 2006. Port Adelaide wore its SANFL Magpies "Prison Bar" guernsey from 1914 when the club was made Champions of Australia.

Adelaide and West Coast did not take part in the 2003 Heritage Round.

Matches - Round 19
 August 8th - Melbourne Demons vs Geelong Cats - Melbourne Cricket Ground.
 August 9th - Collingwood Magpies vs Brisbane Lions - Melbourne Cricket Ground.
 August 9th - Sydney Swans vs Hawthorn Hawks - Sydney Cricket Ground.
 August 9th - Richmond Tigers vs St Kilda Sants - Docklands Stadium.
 August 10th - Port Adelaide Power vs Carlton Blues - Football Park.
 August 10th - Essendon Bombers vs Footscray/Western Bulldogs - Docklands Stadium.
 August 10th - North Melbourne Kangaroos vs Fremantle Dockers - Melbourne Cricket Ground.

Team names in bold indicate the winning team of each match.

Participating teams:
 Brisbane Lions — 1968 to 1973 Fitzroy Lions guernsey.
 Carlton Blues — 1897 guernsey with 1910 logo.
 Collingwood Magpies — 1928 to 1952 guernsey.
 Essendon Bombers — 1897 to 1974 guernsey.
 Footscray/Western Bulldogs — 1935 guernsey.
 Fremantle Dockers — 1896 to 1899 Union/Fremantle (WAFL) guernsey.
 Geelong Cats — 1897 to 1907 guernsey.
 Hawthorn Hawks — 1926 to 1932 guernsey.
 Melbourne Demons — 1897 to 1915 guernsey.
 North Melbourne Kangaroos — 1925 to 1928 guernsey.
 Port Adelaide Power — 1912 to 1916 'Prison Bar' guernsey.
 Richmond Tigers — 1908 to 1909 guernsey.
 St Kilda Saints — 1886 to 1892 guernsey.
 Sydney Swans — 1933 to 1976 guernsey.

2004 Heritage Round
The second Heritage Round in 2004 saw all sixteen teams wear a heritage guernsey. It was also the first year which the Field and Goal Umpires wore uniforms from the past as well. All the umpires wore White uniforms (the traditional colour the umpires wore before changing to coloured uniforms) and the Goal Umpires wore their traditional long coats and White brimmed hats.

Brisbane chose to wear the Brisbane Bears guernsey worn from 1992 until 1996, West Coast wore an original 1987 guernsey and Adelaide wore a manufactured guernsey based on a 1991 original with the SANFL logo on the back and AFC monogram on the front. Port Adelaide wore a Magenta and Blue guernsey based on their original guernsey from 1877 to 1901, prior to its famous black and White "Prison Bar" guernsey. West Coast wore a replica of their 1987 Gold and Blue guernsey.

Matches - Round 18
 July 30th - Adelaide Crows vs North Melbourne Kangaroos - Football Park.
 July 31st - Carlton Blues vs  Fremantle Dockers - Princes Park.
 July 31st - Collingwood Magpies vs Richmond Tigers - Melbourne Cricket Ground.
 July 31st - Sydney Swans vs Brisbane Lions - Sydney Cricket Ground.
 August 1st - Geelong Cats vs St Kilda Saints - Kardinia Park.
 August 1st - Melbourne Demons vs Hawthorn Hawks - Melbourne Cricket Ground.
 August 1st - West Coast Eagles vs Footscray/Western Bulldogs - Subiaco Oval.

Team names in bold indicate the winning team of each match.

Participating teams:
 Adelaide Crows — Manufactured guernsey with club crest.
 Brisbane Lions — 1992 to 1996 Brisbane Bears guernsey.
 Carlton Blues — 1897 guernsey with 1910 monogram.
 Collingwood Magpies — 1923 to 1952 guernsey.
 Essendon Bombers — 1897 to 1974 guernsey.
 Footscray/Western Bulldogs — 1946, 1952 to 1960 guernsey.
 Fremantle Dockers — 1896 to 1899 Fremantle (WAFA\WAFL) guernsey.
 Geelong Cats — 1897 to 1907 guernsey.
 Hawthorn Hawks — 1926 to 1932 guernsey.
 Melbourne Demons — 1897 guernsey combined with 1919 guernsey.
 North Melbourne Kangaroos — 1886 to 1908 guernsey.
 Port Adelaide Power — 1896 to 1901 guernsey.
 Richmond Tigers — 1889 to 1895 guernsey.
 St Kilda Saints — 1933 to 1944 guernsey.
 Sydney Swans — 1933 to 1976 guernsey.
 West Coast Eagles — 1987 to 1988 guernsey.

2005 Heritage Round
The third Heritage Round was held in 2005. The Field Umpires wore replica uniforms from an old fashioned period (with colours brought back) that were impractical in modern day.

The Saints wore a guernsey worn during the First World War in which White was replaced with Gold so they were not to be seen as a supporter of Germany. Hawthorn's guernsey was not Brown and Gold, but Red, White, and Blue from its 1902 guernsey worn when they were a junior club. The Adelaide Football club wore a 1930s South Australia state guernsey with an AFC insignia replacing SA, where Port Adelaide Football Club wore a White guernsey with Light Blue hoops based on their first guernsey in the SANFL.

Matches - Round 20
 August 12th - West Coast Eagles vs Fremantle Dockers - Subiaco Oval.
 August 13th - Geelong Cats vs Melbourne Demons - Kardinia Park.
 August 13th - North Melbourne Kangaroos vs St Kilda Saints - Docklands Stadium.
 August 13th - Collingwood Magpies vs Carlton Blues - Melbourne Cricket Ground.
 August 13th - Port Adelaide Power vs Adelaide Crows - Football Park.
 August 14th - Sydney Swans vs Brisbane Lions - Sydney Olympic Stadium.
 August 14th - Hawthorn Hawks vs Essendon Bombers - Melbourne Cricket Ground.
 August 14th - Richmond Tigers vs Footscray/Western Bulldogs - Docklands Stadium.

Team names in bold indicate the winning team of each match.

Participating teams
 Adelaide Crows — 1930s modified South Australian state football team guernsey.
 Brisbane Lions — 1968 to 1973 Fitzroy Lions guernsey.
 Carlton Blues — 1933 to 1997 guernsey with 1998 to 2014 Carlton Football Club Logo
 Collingwood Magpies — 1923 to 1952 guernsey.
 Essendon Bombers — 1897 to 1974 guernsey.
 Footscray/Western Bulldogs — 1946 and 1952 to 1960 guernsey.
 Fremantle Dockers — 1896 to 1899 Union/Fremantle (WAFL) guernsey.
 Geelong Cats — 1914 to 1918 guernsey.
 Hawthorn Hawks — 1902 guernsey.
 Melbourne Demons — 1897 and 1919 hybrid guernsey.
 North Melbourne Kangaroos — 1925 to 1928 guernsey with North story logo
 Port Adelaide Power — 1870 to 1876 guernsey.
 Richmond Tigers — 1980 to 1986 guernsey.
 St Kilda Saints — 1915 to 1918 guernsey.
 Sydney Swans — 1933 to 1976 guernsey.
 West Coast Eagles — 1987 to 1988 guernsey.

2006 Heritage Round
The fourth Heritage Round in 2006 was themed around football in the 1980s. This achieved very heavy media coverage with both The Footy Show and Before the Game taking on 1980s themes and both dressing up in clothes from the 1980s. The AFL even release a compilation CD of songs recorded during the 1980s.

Brisbane wore the 1987 to 1990 Brisbane Bears clash guernsey, a variant of its original gold and cerise Brisbane Bears guernsey. Adelaide, who were non-existent in the 1980s, wore a modified home guernsey, including an AFC monogrammed crest featuring all the colours of all the teams in the SANFL from the 1980s. Melbourne wore a guernsey with Red and Royal Blue instead of its Red and Navy Blue it used prior to 1974 with the introduction of colour TV. Richmond wore Yellow Shorts from the 1980s with their 1980s Guernsey with printed laces. Essendon wore Red shorts as they did in the 1980s when they played Carlton. West Coast wore a replica of their 1988 to 1994 Blue and Gold guernsey

The AFL prevented Port Adelaide from wearing their 1980s SANFL guernsey.

Matches - Round 16
 July 21st - Adelaide Crows vs North Melbourne - Football Park.
 July 22nd - Essendon Bombers vs Carlton Blues - Melbourne Cricket Ground.
 July 22nd - Collingwood Magpies vs West Coast Eagles - Docklands Stadium.
 July 22nd - Brisbane Lions vs Hawthorn Hawks - Brisbane Cricket Ground.
 July 22nd - Sydney Swans vs Richmond Tigers - Sydney Cricket Ground.
 July 23rd - St Kilda Saints vs Port Adelaide Power - York Park.
 July 23rd - Geelong Cats vs Footscray/Western Bulldogs - Docklands Stadium.
 July 23rd - Fremantle Dockers vs Melbourne Demons - Subiaco Oval.

Team names in bold indicate the winning team of each match.

Participating clubs
 Adelaide Crows — Coloured stripes of the SANFL clubs.
 Brisbane Lions — 1987 to 1990 Brisbane Bears away/clash guernsey.
 Carlton Blues — 1933 to 1997 Guernsey with 1998 to 2014 Carlton monogram.
 Collingwood Magpies — 1981 guernsey.
 Essendon Bombers — 1975 to present guernsey with Red Shorts.
 Footscray/Western Bulldogs — 1980 to 1996 guernsey.
 Fremantle Dockers — 1896 to 1899 Union/Fremantle (WAFL) guernsey.
 Geelong Cats — 1981 to 1993 guernsey.
 Hawthorn Hawks — 1980 to 1989 guernsey.
 Melbourne Demons — 1975 to 1989 guernsey.
 North Melbourne Kangaroos — 1987 to 1995 guernsey.
 Richmond Tigers — 1981 to 1986 guernsey with Yellow Shorts
 St Kilda Saints — 1986 to 1996 guernsey
 Sydney Swans — 1933 to 1976 South Melbourne guernsey
 West Coast Eagles — 1988 to 1994 Royal Blue guernsey worn from Round 17, 1988 to Grand Final 1994

2007 Heritage Round
The fifth Heritage Round in 2007 was based on Football in the 1970s. It took place in July from the 7th to the 9th. Once again it generated media coverage both in News broadcasts and both The Footy Show and Before the Game holding 1970s themed shows.

As West Coast were not established in the 1970s they chose to wear the original WA State of Origin guernsey from the first State of Origin game played against Victoria. They lost to Brisbane who wore the Red and Blue Fitzroy Lions Guernsey worn 1975 to 1996. Adelaide wore the same guernsey as what was worn in the 2006 Heritage Round in its defeat against Hawthorn. Port Adelaide's application to the AFL for its 1970s Black and White "Prison Bar" was rejected at first but an agreement was later reached with Collingwood and the AFL for Port to wear the guernsey this year but with conditions for further heritage rounds. They lost to the Bulldogs who wore an original Footscray guernsey with Red shorts. As Essendon and Richmond were both still wearing guernseys with no major change from what was worn in the 1970s, Essendon once again wore Red shorts and Richmond wore Yellow shorts in both of their games.

Two teams that did not wear a heritage guernsey were St. Kilda, who instead wore their White clash guernsey, and Collingwood.

Other teams to not wear a heritage guernsey due to extreme similarities to current day versions included Geelong, Carlton (whose "CFC" insignia was the current version and not of the one worn from 1933 to 1997), and North Melbourne.

Fremantle had to wear an original East Fremantle guernsey as one of the past guernseys clashed with the old South Melbourne/Sydney jumper, as they were playing the Sydney Swans that round; resulting in the teams taking the field in uniforms almost identical to those of the 1979 WAFL Grand Final- the Fremantle Derby Grand Final between East Fremantle and South Fremantle.

Matches - Round 14
 July 6th - Essendon Bombers vs Geelong Cats - Docklands Stadium.
 July 7th - Collingwood Magpies vs St Kilda Saints - Melbourne Cricket Ground.
 July 7th - Footscray/Western Bulldogs vs Port Adelaide Power - Docklands Stadium.
 July 7th - Adelaide Crows vs Hawthorn Hawks - Football Park.
 July 7th - West Coast Eagles vs Brisbane Lions - Subiaco Oval.
 July 8th - Sydney Swans vs Fremantle Dockers - Sydney Cricket Ground.
 July 8th - Carlton Blues vs Melbourne Demons Melbourne Cricket Ground.
 July 8th - Richmond Tigers vs North Melbourne - Docklands Stadium.

Team names in bold indicate the winning team of each match.

Participating clubs
 Adelaide Crows — Manufactured guernsey with Adelaide crest plus coloured stripes representing the SANFL clubs.
 Brisbane Lions — 1975 to 1996 Fitzroy Lions guernsey.
 Carlton Blues — 1933 to 1997 guernsey with 2007 Carlton monogram.
 Essendon Bombers — 2007 guernsey with red shorts.
 Footscray/Western Bulldogs — 1975 to 1979 guernsey. 
 Fremantle Dockers — 1964 to 1976 East Fremantle guernsey.
 Geelong Cats — 1976 to 1977 guernsey.
 Hawthorn Hawks — 1978 to 1990 guernsey.
 Melbourne Demons — 1975 to 1989 guernsey.
 North Melbourne Kangaroos — 1975 guernsey.
 Port Adelaide Power — 1977 'Prison Bar' guernsey.
 Richmond Tigers — 2007 guernsey with yellow shorts.
 Sydney Swans — 1933 to 1976 guernsey.
 West Coast Eagles — 1977 Western Australia State football team guernsey.

Use of heritage guernseys outside 'Heritage Round' 
Immediately after the demise of AFL sanctioned Heritage Rounds, clubs continued to use throwback uniforms.

2008 AFL season 
In 2008 the AFL celebrated the sesquicentenary of Australian rules football with the Tom Wills game that featured Melbourne and Geelong both wearing heritage guernseys. Richmond celebrated their 100th year of league football by wearing a striped guernsey from their early years. In 2008 Brisbane adopted "Fitzroy’s final 1996 red and blue colours" as its away guernsey for games in Victoria. 

Heritage guernseys used in 2008:

 Brisbane — 1996 Fitzroy colours with Lions motif (Rounds 7, 8, 15, 17 and 19).
 Geelong — 1897 to 1907 guernsey (Round 19).
 North Melbourne — 1925 to 1932 guernsey with club logo (Rounds 5, 16 and 21).
 Melbourne — 1897 guernsey (Round 19).
 Richmond — 1908 guernsey (Round 14).

2009 AFL season 

Brisbane continued to wear their Fitzroy-based red and blue away guernsey. Sydney chose to wear their guernsey from their first premiership to celebrate 100 year since winning it in 1909 against the Carlton Blues in Round 16 at Etihad Stadium.

Heritage guernseys used in 2009:

 Brisbane — Fitzroy colours.
 Sydney — 1909 guernsey (Round 16).

2010 AFL season 
Brisbane continued to use Fitzroy's red and blue in its away guernsey. The Western Bulldogs used their 1970s Footscray logo on a special 'Hall of Fame' guernsey. 

Heritage guernseys used in 2010:

 Brisbane — Fitzroy colours.
 Western Bulldogs — 1970s Footscray logo used.

2011 AFL season 
Sydney wore a heritage guernsey in a commercial promotion with QBE insurance. West Coast celebrated the clubs 25th anniversary by wearing the clubs original guernsey and logo.

Heritage guernseys used in 2011:

 Sydney — 1880 to 1904 guernsey.
 West Coast — 1987 guernsey (Rounds 1 and 20).

2012 AFL season 
Sydney wore a version of its South Melbourne guernsey to celebrate 30 years since their relocation to Sydney, New South Wales.

Heritage guernseys used in 2012:

 Brisbane — 1956 to 1967 Fitzroy guernsey.
 Sydney — 1932 to 1986 guernsey.
 Western Bulldogs — 1970s Footscray logo used.

2013 AFL season 
Port Adelaide wore it's 'Prison Bar' guernsey in the last AFL fixture at Football Park. St Kilda wore their 1873 guernsey to celebrate the clubs 140th anniversary.

Heritage guernseys used in 2013:

 Port Adelaide — 'Prison Bar' guernsey (Round 23).
 St Kilda — 1873 guernsey (Round 7).

2014 AFL season 
As part of Brisbane's Hall of Fame celebrations the club wore replicas of the 1987 Brisbane Bears guernsey. Port Adelaide celebrated 10 years since its inaugural AFL premiership by wearing its 2004 guernsey against Brisbane in Round 4. After refusing to wear a white clash strip in an elimination final, as requested by the AFL, Port Adelaide wore it's Prison Bar guernsey against Richmond on Adelaide Oval. Carlton wore a special guernsey with a heritage version of the club moniker accompanied by the names of members. Carlton also wore a heritage guernsey for rounds 7, 13 and 23. At the end of the 2014 AFL season  Carlton held a member vote to choose between its then-regular guernsey and the guernsey worn in Rounds 7, 13 and 23.

Heritage guernseys used in 2014:

 Brisbane — 1987 Brisbane Bears guernsey (Round 8).
 Carlton — 1910 to 1926 guernsey (Round 10).
 Carlton — 1927 to 1997 guernsey (Rounds 7, 13 and 23).
 Port Adelaide — 2004 guernsey (Round 4).
 Port Adelaide — 'Prison Bar' guernsey (Elimination Final).

2015 AFL season 
Brisbane resumed using the Fitzroy colours on their away guernsey and also wore a special guernsey with the Fitzroy monogram to commemorate 40 years since the Lions first adopted red, gold and blue. Sydney wore a heritage guernsey to celebrate retired South Melbourne player Bob Skilton.

Heritage guernseys used in 2015:

 Brisbane — Fitzroy colours (Rounds 2, 6, 8, 14, 18 and 22).
 Brisbane — Fitzroy colours with Fitzroy monogram (Round 16).
 St Kilda — 1897 guernsey (Round 3, 6, 14, 15, 17 and 18).
 Sydney — 1932 to 1986 guernsey (Round 18).

2016 AFL season 
Carlton wore its 1927 to 1997 guernsey. West Coast celebrated 30 years of the club by using its original guernsey and logo.

Heritage guernseys used in 2016:

 Carlton — 1927 to 1997 guernsey.
 Port Adelaide — 1997 away guernsey.
 West Coast — 1987 guernsey (Rounds 4 and 12).

2017 AFL season 
Brisbane used their Fitzroy colours for games in Victoria.

Heritage guernseys used in 2017:

 Brisbane — Fitzroy colours (away games in Victoria).

2018 AFL season 
St Kilda wore their 1897 heritage guernsey to celebrate the clubs return to Moorabbin Oval. Sydney wore a heritage guernsey to commemorate 100 years since their 1908 VFL premiership. Essendon wore a special guernsey to commemorate their 1965 VFL premiership with a narrower red sash and collars. Melbourne celebrated the clubs 160th year of existence by wearing a homage to its 1919 to 1924 guernsey. North Melbourne supporters voted for the inverse of the clubs 1925 guernsey to be the clubs alternative strip.  

Heritage guernseys used in 2018:

 Brisbane — 1996 Fitzroy colours with Lions motif (away games).
 Essendon — 1965 guernsey.
 Melbourne — 1919 to 1924 guernsey (Round 23).
 North Melbourne – inverse 1925 guernsey (Rounds 3, 10 and 14).
 St Kilda — 1897 guernsey (Round 1).
 Sydney — 1918 guernsey (Round 20).

2019 AFL season 
During ANZAC round Collingwood wore a version of its 1919 VFL premiership guernsey that only features two black stripes. Fremantle wore their original guernsey from 1995 that included the colours green and red. Brisbane wore a heritage guernsey with the Fitzroy monogram to honour retired player Kevin Murray. The Western Bulldogs wore a 1989 heritage guernsey to honour the 'Fightback' campaign that ensured the continuation of the club after it experienced financial difficulties. Hawthorn began wearing its 1933 heritage guernsey in 2019 for some away games. 

Heritage guernseys used in 2019:

 Brisbane — 1996 Fitzroy colours with Lions motif (away games).
 Brisbane — 1974 to 1996 Fitzroy guernsey.
 Collingwood — 1919 guernsey (Round 6).
 Fremantle — 1995 guernsey.
 Hawthorn — 1933 guernsey (Rounds 1, 4, 14 and 23).
 Western Bulldogs — 1989 guernsey.

2020 AFL season 
Port Adelaide were granted permission to use the Prison Bar guernsey in the round two Showdown to celebrate the clubs 150th anniversary. Hawthorn continued to wear their 1933 guernsey design in 2020, in particular during Round 4 to honour the elevation of John Kennedy Sr to 'Legend' status in the Australian Football Hall of Fame. Sydney began celebrating its own 'Swans Heritage Week' by wearing its Heritage guernsey.

Heritage guernseys used in 2020:

 Brisbane — 1996 Fitzroy colours with Lions motif (away games).
 Hawthorn — 1933 guernsey (Rounds 4 and 11).
 Port Adelaide — 'Prison Bar' guernsey (Round 2).
 Sydney Swans — 1932 to 1986 guernsey (Round 17).

2021 AFL season 
Fremantle wore their 1995 away guernsey that included the colours green and red. Brisbane wore a Fitzroy inspired Indigenous Round design including the monogram of the former club.

Port Adelaide's request to wear their 'Prison Bar' guernsey in the 2021 Showdowns was rejected by the AFL. 

Heritage guernseys used in 2021:

 Brisbane — 1974 to 1996 Fitzroy guernsey with Indigenous round patterns (Rounds 11 and 14).
 Brisbane — 1996 Fitzroy colours with Lions motif (Rounds 2, 3, 4, 6, 16, 18, 20, 21, Qualifying Final).
 Fremantle — 1995 away guernsey (Round 20).
 Hawthorn — 1933 guernsey (Rounds 4, 7, 13, 15, 19).
 Sydney Swans — 1932 to 1986 guernsey (Rounds 17, 18, 20 and 22).

2022 AFL season 
Sydney elected to wear their South Melbourne guernsey for all six of its games in Victoria during the 2022 AFL season.

Heritage guernseys used in 2022:
 Brisbane — 1996 Fitzroy colours with Lions motif (away games).
 Sydney Swans — 1932 to 1986 guernsey (six away games in Victoria).
 Fremantle - 1998 to 2000 away guernsey (Round 20)

Controversy

Port Adelaide and Collingwood 

Port Adelaide is the only pre-existing non-Victorian AFL club having joined the national competition in 1997 after having played in the SANFL since 1877. Before joining the AFL Port Adelaide used a Magpie moniker and wore a black-and-white guernsey with six vertical stripes and one horizontal stripe. This guernsey is similar to the Collingwood Magpies which wears a black-and-white guernsey with three stripes of black and white and has been a part of the VFL/AFL since 1897. When Port Adelaide joined the AFL they adopted a new moniker, Power, and added two new colours to their palette, teal and silver. During the 2006 Heritage Round which adopted a 1980s theme Port Adelaide was prevented by the AFL from taking part. During the 1980s Port Adelaide won four SANFL premierships (1980, 1981, 1988, 1989) wearing it's Prison Bar' guernsey. The following year Port Adelaide, Collingwood and the AFL came to an agreement that the first aforementioned club would be able to use their 'Prison Bar' guernsey in future Heritage Rounds. However, after this agreement was reached the AFL ceased sanctioning official Heritage Rounds. In 2021 Eddie McGuire noted that he knew at the time of signing the agreement with Port Adelaide that Heritage Rounds would ceased to be officially sanctioned by the AFL in the future.

See also

NRL Heritage Round

References

External links
 Footy Jumpers, website covering the history of AFL/VFL jumpers

Heritage
Heritage
Heritage
2003 establishments in Australia
2008 disestablishments in Australia